Songs of the Brazos Valley is a studio album by country music artist Hank Thompson and HIs Braos Valley Boys. It was released in 1956 by Capitol Records (catalog no. T-418). It was Thompson's first album.

AllMusic gave the album a rating of four stars. Reviewer Bruce Eder called it "an entertaining combination of fast-paced novelty tunes ..., slow romantic ballads ..., covers ..., and surprisingly brisk adaptations of traditional material."

Track listing
Side A
 "The Wild Side of Life"
 "Rub-A-Dub-Dub"
 "Yesterday's Girl"
 " When You're Lovin', You're Livin'"
 "John Henry"
 "I Saw My Mother's Name"

Side B
 "The New Green Light"
 "Simple Simon"
 "The Letter Edged in Black"
 "Mother, Queen of My Heart"
 "You Don't Have the Nerve"
 "At the Rainbow's End"

References

1956 albums
Hank Thompson (musician) albums
Capitol Records albums